The Jeithi were an indigenous Australian people of the state of New South Wales.

Country
They ranged from the west of Tocumwal to near Howlong, their northern reaches extending to Lake Urana, Jerilderie and Lockhart. Their tribal lands took in areas of both the Yanko and Billabong creeks.

Social organization
Little is known of the tribe, other than that they were composed of several clans with a moiety system.

History of contact
Already at the time of earliest European penetration of their territory, the Jeithi were being displaced by pressure from the Wiradjuri on their territory to the east.

Alternative names
 Yeidthee
 Pikkolatpan.

Some words
 womboi. (kangaroo)
 middi. (tame dog)
 mama. (father)
 gooni. (mother)
 gooin. (whiteman)

Notes

Citations

Sources

Aboriginal peoples of New South Wales